Thiemo de Bakker was the defending champion but chose not to compete.
Éric Prodon defeated Leonardo Tavares 6–4, 6–4 in the final.

Seeds

Draw

Finals

Top half

Bottom half

References
Main Draw
Qualifying Singles

Tampere Open - Singles
Tampere Open